Cytochrome P450 3A43 is a protein that in humans is encoded by the CYP3A43 gene.

This gene encodes a member of the cytochrome P450 superfamily of enzymes. The cytochrome P450 proteins are monooxygenases which catalyze many reactions involved in drug metabolism and synthesis of cholesterol, steroids and other lipids. This enzyme has a low level of testosterone hydroxylase activity. Although it bears homology to some drug-metabolizing cytochrome P450s, it is unknown whether the enzyme is also involved in xenobiotic metabolism. This gene is part of a cluster of cytochrome P450 genes on chromosome 7q21.1. Alternate splicing of this gene results in three transcript variants encoding different isoforms.

References

External links

Further reading